Buckingham is a town in Buckinghamshire, England, United Kingdom. 

Buckingham may also refer to:

Geography

Australia
Buckingham, Queensland, a locality in the Shire of Boulia, Queensland
Buckingham Bay, Northern Territory
Buckingham Land District, Tasmania
Electoral division of Buckingham

Canada
Buckingham, Quebec
Buckingham Island, Nunavut
Buckingham House (fur trade post), Alberta

India
Buckingham Canal, artificial canal between Kakinada and Chennai along the Coromandel Coast named after the British

United Kingdom
Borough of Buckingham
Buckingham Hundred
Buckingham (UK Parliament constituency)
Buckingham Palace, official London residence of the British monarch

United States
Buckingham, Colorado
Buckingham, Florida
Buckingham, Illinois
Buckingham, Iowa
Buckingham Lake, Albany, New York
Buckingham Park, New Jersey
Buckingham Township, Bucks County, Pennsylvania
Buckingham Township, Wayne County, Pennsylvania
Buckingham, Texas
Buckingham, Virginia
Buckingham County, Virginia

Education 
 Buckingham School, an English school
 Buckingham School (Florida), a historic schoolhouse in the United States
 University of Buckingham, a private university in England
 Buckingham Charter Magnet High School, Vacaville, California

Vehicles 
 Bristol Buckingham, a British Second World War airplane
 Buckingham (automobile), an English automobile
 HMS Revenge (1699) or HMS Buckingham, a 70-gun third-rate
 HMS Buckingham (1731), a 70-gun third rate
 HMS Buckingham (1751), a 70-gun third rate
 HMS Eagle (1774) or HMS Buckingham, a 64-gun third rate
 USS Governor Buckingham (1863), an American Civil War-era naval ship
 USS Buckingham (APA-141), a WWII-era American naval ship

Other uses 
 Buckingham (surname)
 Buckingham (unit), a physical unit of quadrupole moment
 The Buckinghams, an American rock group of the 1960s
 Archdeacon of Buckingham, senior ecclesiastical officer in charge of the Church of England in Buckinghamshire
 Bishop of Buckingham, suffragan bishop of the Church of England Diocese of Oxford
 The Duke of Buckingham, a title of British peerage
 Earl of Buckingham, a title of British peerage
 Buckingham Fountain, a fountain in Chicago, Illinois
 Buckingham, a Beanie Baby bear sold exclusively in the United Kingdom

See also 
 The Buckingham (disambiguation)
 Buckingham Browne & Nichols School, a private school in Cambridge, Massachusetts, USA
 Buckingham π theorem, a mathematical theorem about dimensional analysis
 Buckingham potential, an interatomic potential energy model
 HMS Buckingham, a list of ships of the Royal Navy